The following is an incomplete list of known planetary nebulae.

See also 
 Lists of astronomical objects
 Lists of planets
 Lists of exoplanets

References 

Lists of nebulae